Edward Akufo-Addo  (26 June 1906 – 17 July 1979) was a Ghanaian politician and lawyer. He was a member of the "Big Six" leaders of the United Gold Coast Convention (UGCC) and one of the founding fathers of Ghana who engaged in the fight for Ghana's independence. He became the Chief Justice (1966–70), and later ceremonial President (1970–72), of the Republic of Ghana. He was the father of the current (executive) President of Ghana, Nana Addo Akufo-Addo.
Edward Akufo-Addo being a trained lawyer helped him to play his role well in Ghana's Independence. He use his profession to contribute in building the nation. He used his profession to help maintain law and order in the country and help in the establishment of rule of law.

Early life and education
Akufo-Addo was born on 26 June 1906 at Dodowa in the Greater Accra Region to William Martin Addo-Danquah and Theodora Amuafi. Both of his parents were from the southern Ghanaian town of Akropong. He had his primary education at Presbyterian Primary and Middle Schools at Akropong. He continued to Presbyterian Training College, Akropong and Abetifi Theological Training College. In 1929, he entered Achimota College, where he won a scholarship to St Peter's College, Oxford. He studied mathematics, Politics and Philosophy and he went on to graduate with honours in philosophy and politics in 1933.

Pre-political career
Akufo-Addo was called to the Middle Temple Bar, London, UK, in 1940 and returned to what was then the Gold Coast to start a private legal practice a year later in Accra.

Early political career
In 1947, he became a founding member of the United Gold Coast Convention (UGCC) and was one of the "Big Six" (the others being Ebenezer Ako-Adjei, Joseph Boakye Danquah, Kwame Nkrumah, Emmanuel Obetsebi-Lamptey and William Ofori Atta) detained after disturbances in Accra in 1948. From 1949 to 1950, he was a member of the Gold Coast Legislative Council and the Coussey Constitutional Commission.

Post-independence career
After independence (1962–64), Akufo-Addo was a Supreme Court Judge, one of three judges who sat on the treason trial involving Tawia Adamafio, Ako Adjei and three others after the Kulungugu bomb attack on President Kwame Nkrumah and for doing so was dismissed with fellow judges for finding some of the accused not guilty.

From 1966 to 1970, Akufo-Addo was appointed Chief Justice by the National Liberation Council (NLC) regime, as well as Chairman of the Constitutional Commission (which drafted the 1969 Second Republican Constitution). He was also head of the NLC Political Commission during this same time period.

From 31 August 1970 until his deposition by coup d'état on 13 January 1972, Akufo-Addo was President of Ghana in the Second Republic.  Real power rested with the prime minister, Dr Kofi Abrefa Busia. On 17 July 1979, Akufo-Addo died of natural causes.

Awards and honors
Honorary Doctorate from the University of Oxford in 1971.

See also
The Big Six
List of judges of the Supreme Court of Ghana
Chief Justice of Ghana
Heads of state of Ghana

References

External links
 "Dr. Edward Akufo Addo", Ghana Nation, 15 November 2011.

 
 – 
 
 

1906 births
1979 deaths
20th-century Ghanaian judges
Ghanaian Presbyterians
Presidents of Ghana
Alumni of Achimota School
Alumni of St Peter's College, Oxford
Members of the Middle Temple
United Gold Coast Convention politicians
People from Greater Accra Region
Justices of the Supreme Court of Ghana
Ghanaian independence activists